In computer design, Pico-ITX is a PC motherboard form factor announced by VIA Technologies in January 2007 and demonstrated later the same year at CeBIT. The formfactor was transferred over to SFF-SIG in 2008. The Pico-ITX form factor specifications call for the board to be , which is half the area of Nano-ITX.

EPIA PX

PX10000G 
The first motherboard produced in this form factor is called EPIA PX10000G. The operating temperature range is from 0°C to about 50°C. The operating humidity level (relative and non-condensing) can be from 0% to about 95%. It uses a 1 GHz VIA C7-M processor, a VIA VX700 chip set, and is RoHS compliant.

It has onboard VGA video, VIA VT6106S 10/100 8P8C Ethernet, UDMA 33/66/100/133 44-pin ATA (1x), and SATA (1x) I/O. DVI and LVDS video-out, USB 2.0, COM, PS/2 Mouse & Keyboard, and HD 5.1 channel audio (supplied by a VIA VT1708A chip) are supported through the usage of I/O pin headers and add-on modules/daughter cards.

It has been demonstrated running Microsoft Windows XP and Windows Vista. older versions of major Linux distributions, including Fedora Core 6 and Ubuntu 7.10, will also run on it. It is available as a single board, as well as part of a barebones package, the Artigo, a small form factor complete computer.

PX5000 
This model is similar to the PX10000G, but uses the 500 MHz VIA Eden ULV CPU.

There are two versions of this model, the PX5000G, which has a fan-assisted heatsink, and the PX5000EG, which has a fanless heatsink.

Add-on modules 
(Note: Either the VIA PX-O add-on module or 4 USB 2.0 I/O are supplied in retail packages.)
The VIA PX-O daughtercard supplies access to:
 1 RCA-out for S/PDIF usage
 4 USB 2.0 ports
 1 3.5mm Mic-in, 1 3.5mm line-out, 1 3.5mm line-in
 1 buzzer/speaker
 1 CN9 connector (function TBC)
 1 CN10 connector (function TBC).

The VIA VT1625M daughtercard supplies access to:
 1 external TV-out
 1 video capture port.

The Serener PXFPIO (also labeled under VIA PX-DIO) is 109mm × 22mm in size and connects via a 120mm ribbon cable through a daughter card. This addon may require modification to the heatsink due to the size of the daughter card. It supplies access to:
 power & reset switches
 3.5mm audio in/out
 S/PDIF-in
 power & HDD activity LEDs
 4 USB 2.0 ports

The VIA PX-TC daughter card, compatible with the PX10000G only, is designed to enhance the multimedia capture and output. It supplies access to:
 1 S-Video port
 1 video-in port
 1 YPbPr port
 1 S/PDIF-out

EPIA-P700 
The second motherboard series in this form factor, the P700 series improves upon the PX10000G series by offering Gigabit Ethernet (Using the VIA VT6122 chipset) or a 10/100 Ethernet adapter (VIA VT6107) as a manufacturing option, integrating the power adapter (allowing for direct +12V DC-In & enabling it to directly power SATA), and making the Ethernet & VGA ports optional via the P700-A daughter card.

Expanded functionality is offered via the following pin I/O:
 1 LAN
 1 VGA/DVI
 1 COM Port
 1 Audio pin connector for Line-out, Line-in, MIC-in
 1 Front panel
 4 USB 2.0
 1 PS2 mouse/keyboard
 1 LVDS
 1 LPC/SM Bus/GPIO (Unusable due to VIA not releasing a GPIO driver)

The EPIA-P700-10L has a 1 GHz VIA C7 CPU.

The EPIA-P700-05LE has a 500 MHz VIA Eden ULV CPU and has a passive heatsink.

Add-on modules 
The P700 comes retail with the P700-A & P700-B daughter cards.

The P700-A supplies:
 Gigabit Ethernet
 1 VGA port
 1 COM port
 DVI port via I/O cable

The P700-B supplies:
 4 USB 2.0 ports
 1 Buzzer
 1 Line-out, 1 Line-in, 1 MIC-in (3.5 mm)

Intel-based products
Even though the form factor was introduced by VIA Technologies, there are also boards available based on Intel processors. Some have the CPU and the chipset directly on the Pico-ITX board.

ARM-based products
Pico-ITX boards are also available with ARM architecture. In this field DH electronics uses the standardized DHCOM Computer On Modules with several ARM based modules.

Pico-ITXe 

The Pico-ITXe specification adds onto the Pico-ITX form factor by taking the EPIA-P700 and upgrading the chipset to a VX800, doubling the maximum RAM to 2 GB, allowing for 667/533 SO-DIMM RAM, upgrading the GPU to VIA's Chrome9 HC3, and adding support for SUMIT. Another notable addition is the expansion from 10 to 12 layers thickness.

See also 
 EPIA
 Mini-ITX
 Mobile-ITX
 Ultra-Mobile PC

References

External links 
 Pico-ITX Initiative Website
 VIA EPIA PX Motherboard Series Home Page
 "EPIA PX-Series Pico-ITX Mainboard Operating Guide" (Version 1.1, 1.12MB PDF)
 EPIA-PX User’s Manual (Version 1.11, 478KB PDF)
 "World's first pico-itx review", the VIA PX10000G (mini-itx.com)
 Level Eleven Pico-ITX case mod

Motherboard
Motherboard form factors